A hotdish is a casserole dish that typically contains a starch, a meat, and a canned or frozen vegetable mixed with canned soup that must be served hot or warm. A classic example is made with ground beef, topped with tater tots, and flavored with thick condensed cream of mushroom soup sauce, but some versions in Minnesota use the official state grain wild rice, or even macaroni, in place of the potatoes. The dish originates in the Upper Midwest region of the United States, where it remains popular, particularly in Minnesota, South Dakota, Wisconsin, North Dakota, and eastern Montana. Hotdish is cooked in a single baking dish, and served hot (per its name). It commonly appears at communal gatherings such as family reunions, potlucks, and church suppers.

History

The history of the hotdish goes back to when "budget-minded farm wives needed to feed their own families, as well as congregations in the basements of the first Minnesota churches."  According to Howard Mohr, author of How to Talk Minnesotan, "A traditional main course, hotdish is cooked and served hot in a single baking dish and commonly appears at family reunions and church suppers." The most typical meat for many years has been ground beef, and cream of mushroom remains the favorite canned soup. In years past, a pasta was the most frequently used starch, but tater tots and local wild rice have become very popular as well.

In 2016 Food & Wine credited a 1930 Mankato church congregation as the first written record of a hotdish recipe.  The source included neither the name of the woman that invented the recipe nor the source.  Mankato resident, Joyce Nelson, 90, had a copy of the 1930 Lutheran church recipe book and it was found that the recipe was indeed included in that year's cookbook.  Mrs. C. W. Anderson had submitted the recipe for a HOT DISH made with hamburger, onions, Creamette pasta, celery, a can of peas, tomato soup and tomatoes. 

Hotdishes are filling, convenient, and easy to make. They are well-suited for family reunions, funerals, church suppers, and covered dish dinners or potlucks where they may be paired with potato salad, coleslaw, Jello salads, Snickers salad, and pan-baked desserts known as bars.

Ingredients

Typical ingredients in hotdish are potatoes or pasta, ground beef, green beans, and corn, with canned soup added as a binder, flavoring and sauce. Potatoes may be in the form of tater tots, hash browns, potato chips, or shoe string potatoes. The dish is usually seasoned lightly with salt and pepper, and it may be eaten with ketchup as a condiment. Another popular hotdish is the tuna hotdish, made with macaroni  or egg noodles, canned tuna, peas, and mushroom soup. Also common is a dish known as goulash, though it bears no resemblance to the familiar Hungarian goulash.  Minnesota goulash is usually made with ground beef, macaroni, canned tomatoes, and perhaps a can of creamed corn.

Cream of mushroom soup is so ubiquitous in hotdish that it is often referred to in such recipes as “Lutheran Binder,” referring to hotdish's position as a staple of Lutheran church cookbooks. The soup is considered a defining ingredient by some commentators.

Minnesota Congressional Hot Dish Competition

After the 2010 U.S. midterm elections, then Senator Al Franken invited the members of the Minnesota congressional delegation to a friendly hotdish-making competition, to come together in celebration of the state before the beginning of the legislative session. Six out of 10 delegation members — Sens. Franken and Amy Klobuchar and Representatives Michele Bachmann, Tim Walz, Keith Ellison and Betty McCollum — participated, with Klobuchar taking first place with her "Taconite Tater Tot Hotdish" and Walz taking second with his "Chicken Mushroom Wild Rice Hotdish".

For the second competition in March 2012, Franken's "Mom's Mahnomen Madness Hotdish" tied with Chip Cravaack's "Minnesota Wild Strata Hotdish" for first place.

With 9 of the 10 members of the delegation participating in 2013, the winner was Congressman Walz's "Hermann the German Hotdish", which featured a bottle of August Schell beer. Sen. Franken has also provided a free PDF version of the 2013 Hotdish Off collection of recipes.

In 2014 all ten members participated, with Rep. Walz's "Turkey Trot Tater Tot Hotdish" winning.  In 2015, again all ten participated, and Rep. McCollum's "Turkey, Sweet Potato, and Wild Rice" dish won.

Past winners
2011 Sen. Amy Klobuchar's Taconite Tater Tot Hot Dish
2012 Sen. Al Franken's Mom's Mahnomen Madness Hotdish and Rep. Chip Cravaack's Minnesota Wild Strata Hotdish (tie)
2013 Rep. Tim Walz's Hermann the German Hotdish
2014 Rep. Tim Walz's Turkey Trot Tater Tot Hotdish
2015 Rep. Betty McCollum’s Turkey, Sweet Potato, and Wild Rice Hotdish
2016 Rep. Tim Walz’s Turkey Taco Tot Hotdish
2017 Rep. Collin Peterson’s Right to Bear Arms Hotdish
2018 Rep. Tom Emmer's Hotdish of Champions
2019 Rep. Betty McCollum's Hotdish A-Hmong Friends

In popular culture 

Hotdish frequently appeared, along with other stereotypical Minnesotan dishes such as lutefisk, in the radio program A Prairie Home Companion. Hotdish is also described in Howard Mohr’s book How to Talk Minnesotan. Hotdish is an integral element of the book Hotdish to Die For, a collection of six culinary mystery short stories in which the weapon of choice is hotdish.

Minnesota public television station KSMQ in Austin, Minnesota has produced a 2012 documentary video entitled "Minnesota Hotdish." providing a historical and humorous look at the popular church supper and family gathering staple.

Hotdish was the main meal featured in the comedy-drama film Manny & Lo.

"Hot Dish" is the name of an Anchorage-based bluegrass band.  Their band name was chosen as a nod to the Midwestern roots of three of the five band members.

See also

 Cassoulet
 Casserole
 Tuna casserole
 Green bean casserole
 List of casserole dishes
 Funeral potatoes
 Rappie pie
 Timballo
 Comfort food
 Cuisine of the Midwestern United States
 Kugel

References

Further reading

 
 
 

Casserole dishes
Cuisine of the Midwestern United States
Food and drink in North Dakota
Food and drink in South Dakota
Cuisine of Minnesota